Harrold Municipal Airport  is a city-owned, public-use airport located one nautical mile (1.85 km) northwest of the central business district of Harrold, in Hughes County, South Dakota, United States.

Facilities and aircraft 
It has one runway designated 15/33 with an asphalt and turf surface measuring 2,250 by 200 feet (686 x 61 m).

For the 12-month period ending September 29, 2008, the airport had 5,750 general aviation aircraft operations, an average of 15 per day.

References

External links 
 Aerial image as of 6 October 1997 from USGS The National Map
 

Defunct airports in the United States
Airports in South Dakota
Buildings and structures in Hughes County, South Dakota
Transportation in Hughes County, South Dakota